Bengali-Fodé Koita (born 21 October 1990) is a Guinean professional footballer who plays as a striker for Süper Lig club Kasımpaşa, on loan from Trabzonspor, and the Guinea national team.

Club career
Koita was born in Paris, France. He made his professional debut for Montpellier on 16 January 2009, in a Ligue 2 game against Amiens SC. He scored his first goal against Lyon in a 3–2 defeat.

On 21 July 2015, he signed a two-year contract at English club Blackburn Rovers of the Football League Championship. However, Koita struggled to make an impact at the club and failed to score a single goal in his fourteen appearances. On 27 January 2016, he signed for Turkish club Kasımpaşa S.K. for a fee of €320,000.

International career
He was called up to the Guinea national team by manager Luis Fernández for the 2017 Africa Cup of Nations.

He made his Guinea national football team debut on 11 June 2019 in a friendly against Benin, as a starter.

Honours
Trabzonspor
 Süper Lig: 2021–22

Career statistics

International

References

External links
 
 

1990 births
Footballers from Paris
French sportspeople of Guinean descent
Citizens of Guinea through descent
Black French sportspeople
Living people
Guinean footballers
Guinea international footballers
French footballers
France under-21 international footballers
Association football forwards
Montpellier HSC players
RC Lens players
Le Havre AC players
Stade Malherbe Caen players
Blackburn Rovers F.C. players
Kasımpaşa S.K. footballers
Trabzonspor footballers
Ligue 1 players
Ligue 2 players
English Football League players
Süper Lig players
2019 Africa Cup of Nations players
French expatriate footballers
Guinean expatriate footballers
Expatriate footballers in England
French expatriate sportspeople in England]
Guinean expatriate sportspeople in England]
Expatriate footballers in Turkey
French expatriate sportspeople in Turkey]
Guinean expatriate sportspeople in Turkey]